The James N. Gladding House is a historic house in the Spruce Park neighborhood of Albuquerque, New Mexico. It is listed on the National Register of Historic Places both individually and as a contributing property in the Spruce Park Historic District. The house was built in 1926 by James N. Gladding, who was the president of the Southwestern Construction Company and a partner in the Gaastra & Gladding architecture firm with T. Charles Gaastra. Gladding was the developer of the Spruce Park neighborhood, then known as the Country Club Addition, and built the house as a model home for the subdivision. He later lived there himself from 1928 to 1934. Later residents included novelist Conrad Richter and a local artist who constructed a studio at the rear of the property.

The house is notable as a fine example of the Pueblo Revival style architecture which was popular in Albuquerque during the interwar period. It is a one-story, L-shaped adobe building organized around a walled courtyard. The house is one room deep and has a portal or veranda, supported by corbelled wooden posts and vigas, along both sides of the courtyard. Two later additions were constructed at the rear of the house, a freestanding artist's studio, and a two-story addition which joined the studio to the main house.

References

New Mexico State Register of Cultural Properties
National Register of Historic Places in Albuquerque, New Mexico
Houses on the National Register of Historic Places in New Mexico
Houses in Albuquerque, New Mexico
Houses completed in 1926
Pueblo Revival architecture in Albuquerque, New Mexico